Niklas Tauer (born 17 February 2001) is a German footballer who plays as a defensive midfielder for Bundesliga club Schalke 04, on loan from Mainz 05.

Career
Tauer made his debut for Mainz 05 in the first round of the 2020–21 DFB-Pokal on 11 September 2020, coming on as a substitute in the 85th minute for Jean-Paul Boëtius against fourth-division side TSV Havelse, with the match finishing as a 5–1 win. He made his Bundesliga debut the following week on 20 September, coming on as a substitute for Danny Latza in the 86th minute of Mainz's away match against RB Leipzig, which finished as a 3–1 loss.

On 21 December 2022, Schalke 04 announced the signing of Tauer on a one-and-a-half-year loan.

Career statistics

References

External links
 
 
 
 

2001 births
Living people
Sportspeople from Mainz
Footballers from Rhineland-Palatinate
German footballers
Germany youth international footballers
Association football midfielders
1. FSV Mainz 05 players
1. FSV Mainz 05 II players
FC Schalke 04 players
FC Schalke 04 II players
Bundesliga players
Regionalliga players